Nivetha Thomas (born 2 November 1995) is an Indian actress who appears in Telugu, Malayalam and Tamil language films. She made her film debut as a child artist in the 2008 Malayalam film Veruthe Oru Bharya, for which she won the Kerala State Film Award for Best Child Artist.

She went on to star as a lead in films like Chaappa Kurishu (2011), Romans (2013), Jilla (2014), Papanasam (2015), Gentleman (2016), Ninnu Kori (2017), Jai Lava Kusa (2017), 118 (2019), Brochevarevarura (2019), V (2020) and Vakeel Saab (2021).

Early life
Nivetha Thomas was born on 2 November 1995 in Madras (now Chennai), India. Her roots are in Edoor village of Iritty taluk, Kerala.  She was schooled at Holy Angels and Montfort Matriculation School, Chennai. She pursued Bachelor of Architecture from SRM University. She can speak Malayalam, Tamil, French, Hindi, Telugu, and English.

Career

Early career and film debut 
She started her career as a child actress, acting in the popular Sun TV serial My Dear Bootham. After that, she played the role of Jayaram's daughter in Veruthe Oru Bharya, where her performance was well appreciated. She then signed a few Tamil and Malayalam films in which she mostly played supporting roles. Among her Malayalam projects were Chaappa Kurish and Thattathin Marayathu, the latter of which according to Sify was going to be "the biggest box-office hit in the history of Malayalam cinema". The 2011 Tamil film Poraali directed by Samuthirakani, featured her as Tamizhselvi, a petrol bunk employee. She had previously collaborated with Samuthirakani in the drama series Arasi.

In 2013, Thomas acted in Romans which was very successful and named a "blockbuster" by Sify.com. In the Tamil contemporary fantasy comedy Naveena Saraswathi Sabatham she played the female lead role of Jaishree, an aspiring singer. In Jilla she played the role of Mahalakshmi, who is very attached to her father (Mohanlal) and two brothers, played by Vijay and Mahath. About her role, she stated that it was not "just another sister role" but that of "a strong willed girl who influences her brother in a positive way". She signed her first Telugu film, Juliet Lover of Idiot directed by Ajay Vodhirala. She acted as Kamal Haasan's eldest daughter in the Tamil remake of Drishyam, titled Papanasam, and her performance earned praise from viewers.

2016-18: Telugu debut and success
In 2016, Thomas debuted in Telugu cinema in the action-thriller Gentleman opposite Nani which opened to rave reviews and was critically applauded for her performance both by critics and audience alike and garnered her several awards including SIIMA Award for Best Female Debut (Telugu) at 6th South Indian International Movie Awards and a Filmfare Award for Best Actress – Telugu Nomination at 64th Filmfare Awards South Later on, she acquired popularity among Telugu cinema.
 
Her first release in 2017 was another Telugu film, opposite Nani again, the romantic entertainer Ninnu Kori which opened to positive reviews and highly praised her performance as "pallavi" which eventually landed her second Filmfare Award for Best Actress – Telugu Nomination at 65th Filmfare Awards South. Her next release was Jai Lava Kusa opposite Jr. NTR was one of the top-grossing movies in 2017 at boxoffice. Her last release was Juliet Lover of Idiot opposite Naveen Chandra which was delayed and released later to become a commercial failure at the boxoffice. In October 2018, Thomas signed romantic drama Swaasa, co-starring Nikhil Siddharth.

2019: Comeback 

Thomas first release in 2019 was an action thriller 118 opposite Nandamuri Kalyan Ram which opened to positive reviews and critics extremely praised Thomas's outstanding performance in a brief yet impressive role. Later, she starred in the black comedy film Brochevarevarura opposite Sree Vishnu was opened to positive reviews and got widespread acclaim for her portrayal of "mitra" an underperformer student in academics who aspires to become a classical dancer, Later the film was a hit at box office.

In 2020 Thomas starred in Rajinikanth's Darbar in which she plays his daughter. She also starred Indraganti-directed action thriller V later that year. In 2021, Thomas is featured in Vakeel Saab, the Telugu remake of Hindi film Pink, starring Pawan Kalyan.

Thomas also starred in Sudheer Varma-directed Saakini Daakini, the Telugu remake of the Korean film Midnight Runners, along with Regina Cassandra.

Filmography

Film

Television

Awards and nominations

References

External links

 
 Nivetha Thomas official page at Twitter

Living people
Indian film actresses
Actresses in Tamil cinema
Kerala State Film Award winners
Actresses in Malayalam cinema
Indian child actresses
Indian television child actresses
21st-century Indian child actresses
Actresses in Tamil television
Indian television actresses
Child actresses in Tamil cinema
Actresses in Telugu cinema
South Indian International Movie Awards winners
1995 births
Malayali people
Actresses from Chennai
Child actresses in Malayalam cinema